The  is a cluster of Kofun period burial mounds located in the Yodoe neighborhood of the city of Yonago, Tottori Prefecture, in the San'in region of Japan. It was designated a National Historic Site in 1932, with the area under protection expanded in 1999.

Overview
During the Kofun period, the Yodoe Plain formed a lagoon, and hundreds of burial mounds were constructed in the surrounding hills. The Mukaiyama cluster is located to the east of the lagoon, and consists of a 17 kofun, including nine keyhole-shaped, five circular, and two square burial mounds. Its design shows an influence of the Izumo region. In addition to fukiishi, cylindrical haniwa and figurative haniwa (warrior dolls, horse-shaped haniwa, waterfowl-shaped haniwa, etc.) have been found. Grave goods included Iron swords and gilt-bronze harnesses. The tumulus is estimated to have been constructed in the latter half of the 6th century in the late Kofun period. It was designated a National Historic Site in 1932.  

From 1985 to 1989, an extensive surveying and archaeological excavation was conducted, and the area of the National Historic Site designation expanded in 1999.  Among the kofun constructed from the latter half of the 5th century to the latter half of the 6th century, Mukaiyama No. 3, Mukaiyama No. 4, Ishiumadani, and Iwaya Kofun were typical zenpō-kōen-fun of western Hoki Province. A stone horse found in the Edo period at the Ishiumatani Kofun suggest exchanges with northern Kyushu, and the only other known examples are from that region.  It was made the shintai of a nearby Shinto shrine and was designated a National Important Cultural Property in 1959.  

Gallery

See also
List of Historic Sites of Japan (Tottori)

References

External links

Yonago City home page 
Tottori Prefecture home page 

Kofun
Archaeological sites in Japan
History of Tottori Prefecture
Yonago, Tottori
Historic Sites of Japan